The 4th Trampoline World Championships were held in Crystal Palace London, England on 17 June 1967.

Results

Men

Trampoline

Trampoline Synchro

Women

Trampoline

Trampoline Synchro

References
 Trampoline UK
 FIG Press Information Kit 

Trampoline World Championships
Trampoline Gymnastics World Championships
Trampoline World Championships
1967 in London
1967 in English sport
International gymnastics competitions hosted by the United Kingdom